is a Japanese voice actress affiliated with Atomic Monkey. She voiced Riina Tada in The Idolmaster Cinderella Girls, for which she received a top-ten charting single. She also voiced Ranra in The World Is Still Beautiful, Yucho La in Idol Memories, Katrina in RoboMasters: The Animated Series, and Marin in Hyrule Warriors Legends.

Biography
Ruriko Aoki was born on 24 March in Saitama Prefecture. In junior high school, Aoki became conscious of the profession of voice actors for the first time. She was a member of the high school broadcasting club, where she worked in production, advertising, and announcer work. Aoki went to university aiming at broadcasting relations because there were a wide range of possibilities.

In 2014, she was cast as Ranra in The World Is Still Beautiful. In 2017, she was cast as Katrina in RoboMasters: The Animated Series. She voices Ayu in the second episode of Hakata Mentai! Pirikarako-chan, which aired in 2019.

She voiced Riina Tada in The Idolmaster Cinderella Girls. Riina Tana's single, released on 23 January 2013, charted at #7 in the Oricon Singles Chart on 4 February 2013. She reprised her Idolmaster role in the Cinderella Girls Theater, and also appears in several albums and singles made for Cinderella Girls. She later said in an interview that she called the producers' voices the best part of the Cinderella Girls' first live concert in April 2014. She also voices the Chinese-born Yucho La in Idol Memories.

She voices Marin in Hyrule Warriors Legends, for which she also appeared in a gameplay video released in January 2016. Aoki said in an interview with Famitsu that, as a kid, she was a fan of the Legend of Zelda video game franchise. Aoki appeared in NHK's Symphonic Gamers concert in October 2016. She also makes an appearance in a March 2016 magazine/book for Splatoon.

Personal life
Aoki has a younger brother.

Filmography

Anime 
2012
 Ginga e Kickoff!!, schoolgirl
 Shirokuma Cafe, elementary school student
 Sword Art Online, player
 My Little Monster, Maki
 Yu-Gi-Oh! Zexal, researcher
2013
Day Break Illusion, Priscilla Twilight
Samurai Flamenco, convenience store clerk, girl B
Namiuchigiwa no Muromi-san, mermaid #2
2014
Your Lie in April, audience, announcement, broadcasting club Girls
The World Is Still Beautiful, Ranra
Noragami, Keiichi's mom, teacher
Hamatora, high school girl, newscaster
2015
The Idolmaster Cinderella Girls, Riina Tada
Cross Ange, Nonna
2016
Idol Memories, Yucho La
2017
Yowamushi Pedal: New Generation, student
Sakura Quest, young Noge
RoboMasters: The Animated Series, Katrina
2018
Anonymous Noise, homeroom teacher
Takunomi., Mama Kiriyama
Uma Musume Pretty Derby, Air Groove
Xuan Yuan Sword Luminary, Muyu Rou
2019
Hakata Mentai! Pirikarako-chan, Ayu (ep 2)
2021
PuraOre! Pride of Orange, Juri Kikuchi
Muv-Luv Alternative, Yūko Kōzuki
Komi Can't Communicate, Nene Onemine
2022
The Rising of the Shield Hero 2, Eclair Seaetto
Lucifer and the Biscuit Hammer, Kil Zonne
2023
Handyman Saitō in Another World, Franlil
Saving 80,000 Gold in Another World for My Retirement, Elinu
The Café Terrace and Its Goddesses, Ōka Makuzawa

Anime film
2012
Wolf Children

Video games
2009
Lord of Vermilion, Byūnei
2010
Lord of Arcana, female player voice
2012
The Idolmaster Cinderella Girls, Riina Tada
E.X. Troopers, Yuna
Kaizoku Fantasia, Rinon
2013
Ken ga Kimi, Hattori Hanzō
2014
White Cat Project Anna, Kathy, Lupinous
Rage of Bahamut, Reizu
2015
Ukiyo-no-Shishi, dragon
Ken ga Kimi for V, Hattori Hanzō
2016
Hyrule Warriors Legends, Marin
Ensemble Girls!, Mai Anjou
Icchibanketsu Online, Mikoshinyūdō, Fukusuke
Girls' Frontline as M500, M590
2017
Alternative Girls, Natalie Nakata
2018
Far Cry 5, Kim Lai
Octopath Traveler, Tresa Corzone
2019
Touhou Cannonball, Sakuya Izayoi
2020
Azur Lane, HMS Dido, HMS Sirius
2022
Witch on the Holy Night, Touko Aozaki
2023
Crymachina, Mikoto Sengiku

Dubbing 
2013
Hostages, Morgan Sanders
Rizzoli & Isles
2014
Endeavour
Person of Interest Season 4, Claire Mahoney
Bates Motel (TV series), Hayden

Digital comics
2012
Milenovich, schoolgirl,
2013
Kono Oto Tomare! Sounds of Life, sempai

References

External links
 Official agency profile (Japanese)
 

1990 births
Living people
Japanese video game actresses
Japanese voice actresses
Voice actresses from Saitama Prefecture